Alena is a feminine given name from the origins Russia and Czechia.

People 
Alena is a variant of Helen. People with this name include:
 Saint Alena (died 640), born in Dilbeek, Belgium, and martyred c. 640
 Alena Douhan, Belarusian diplomat
 Alena Holubeva (born 1994), Belarusian basketball player
 Alena Matejka (Alena Matějková, born 1966), Czech sculptor and glass designer
 Alena Mazouka (born 1967), Belarusian long-distance runner
 Alena Mihulová (born 1965), Czech actress, married to director Karel Kachyňa
 Alena Šeredová (born 1978), Czech model
 Alena Vránová, (born 1932) Czech actress
 Alena Vrzáňová (1931–2015), Czech athlete, figure skater

It is also a Catalan last name. People with this name include:
 Carles Aleñá (born 1998), Spanish footballer

Fiction 
 Alena (Encantadia), a fictional character who possesses the Gem of Water on several Filipino telefantasyas 
 Alena Vorshevsky, a fictional character from Call of Duty: Modern Warfare 3
 Alena (1947 film), a 1947 Czech film
 Alena (graphic novel), a Swedish graphic novel
 Alena (2015 film), a 2015 Swedish film based on the graphic novel

Other uses 
 ALENA (Accord de libre-échange nord-américain, lit. "Agreement of Free Trade, North American"), French acronym for the North American Free Trade Agreement
 Alena (snakefly), a genus of Raphidioptera snakeflies

See also 
 Aleena (disambiguation)
 Alina (disambiguation)
 Alyona

Feminine given names